Michális Dórizas (April 16, 1886 – October 21, 1957) was a Greek athlete who competed in throwing events at the 1906, 1908 and 1912 Summer Olympics. He won a silver medal in the javelin throw in 1908 and a bronze in the stone throw in 1906. In the discus throw his best achievement was fifth place in 1908, and in the shot put he placed 11th in 1912.

Dorizas was born to Greek parents in Constantinople, where he graduated from the Robert College. In 1913 he moved to the United States to study at the University of Pennsylvania. In the U.S. he soon became one of the best heavyweight wrestlers, winning the intercollegiate championships in 1914-1916. He also played as an American football guard for two years and continued to compete in throwing events. During World War I he served as a U.S. Army Sergeant in France, and after the war as a Greek-Turkish-English interpreter at the Paris Peace Conference, 1919, and as a geographer with the American Section of the International Commission on Mandates.

In 1915 he received a master's degree in philosophy and began teaching geography and working on his PhD. He was voted as most popular Penn professor for several years. In 1943, the Friars Senior Society called him "the faculty member who the greatest service to the University during the course of the year." He continued teaching at Penn until his death in 1957.

References

External links 
 

1886 births
Constantinopolitan Greeks
1957 deaths
Greek male javelin throwers
Olympic athletes of Greece
Athletes (track and field) at the 1906 Intercalated Games
Athletes (track and field) at the 1908 Summer Olympics
Athletes (track and field) at the 1912 Summer Olympics
Olympic silver medalists for Greece
Robert College alumni
Sportspeople from Istanbul
Greek players of American football
American football guards
Penn Quakers football players
Medalists at the 1908 Summer Olympics
Olympic silver medalists in athletics (track and field)
United States Army personnel of World War I